Ilikovo (İlek) is a rural locality (a selo) and the administrative centre of Gorkovsky Selsoviet, Kushnarenkovsky District, Bashkortostan, Russia. The population was 541 as of 2010. There are 5 streets.

Geography 
Ilikovo is located 34 km northwest of Kushnarenkovo (the district's administrative centre) by road. Kyzylkuper is the nearest rural locality.

References 

Rural localities in Kushnarenkovsky District